PDH may refer to:

 Angiotensin-converting enzyme, an enzyme
 Plesiochronous digital hierarchy, in telecommunications networks
 Pound–Drever–Hall technique for stabilizing a laser's output
 Pyranose dehydrogenase (acceptor), an enzyme
 Pyruvate dehydrogenase, an enzyme